The Environment Protection Act 1993 is a law in the Australian state of South Australia "to provide for the protection of the environment; to establish the Environment Protection Authority and define its functions and powers; and for other purposes."

See also
Environment of Australia
Climate change in Australia
Law of Australia

References

External links
Environment Protection Act 1993 at the Government of South Australia

Environment of South Australia
Environmental law in Australia
South Australia legislation
1993 in Australian law
1993 in the environment
1990s in South Australia